Russian Silicon Valley may refer to:
 Zelenograd, Soviet/Russian center of electronics and microelectronics, which was developed as a reflection of the California Silicon Valley since 1962
 Skolkovo Innovation Center, Russian high technology business area near Moscow, which was announced in 2009